Carmen Altagracia Imbert Brugal (b. Puerto Plata, 25 November 1955), is a Dominican jurist, author, journalist and columnist.

Biography

Early life and family
Imbert was born to Segundo Manuel Imbert Barrera (the elder brother of General Antonio Imbert Barrera) and Martha Beatriz Brugal Mateos. She is great-granddaughter of Segundo Imbert and Andrés Brugal, and great-great-granddaughter of José María Imbert.

Career
Imbert has a law degree magna cum laude from the Universidad Nacional Pedro Henríquez Ureña university (1978).

Imbert Brugal has been professor at Universidad Nacional Pedro Henríquez Ureña, Universidad Iberoamericana (UNIBE), and Santo Domingo Institute of Technology.

In November 2016, Imbert was designated a member of the Central Electoral Board.

Works
 Palabras de Otros Tiempos y de Siempre (poetry; 1983)
 Prostitución: Esclavitud Sexual Femenina (essay; 1985)
 Infidencias (short stories; 1986)
 Tráfico de Mujeres: Visión de una Nación Explotada (essay; 1991)
 Distinguida Señora (novel; 1995)
 El Ministerio Público (essay; 1998)
 Volver Al Frío (novel; 2003)

Some writings authored by Imbert were published in Daisy Cocco de Filippis’s anthologies like Combatidas, Combativas y Combatientes and Sin Otro Profeta que su Canto.

References

Living people
1956 births
Dominican Republic people of Catalan descent
Dominican Republic people of Cuban descent
Dominican Republic people of French descent
Dominican Republic people of Galician descent
Dominican Republic people of German descent
People from Puerto Plata, Dominican Republic
Dominican Republic women writers
Universidad Nacional Pedro Henríquez Ureña alumni
Academic staff of Universidad Nacional Pedro Henríquez Ureña
White Dominicans